Devin Beliveau is an American politician and schoolteacher from Maine. In 2010, he was elected to the Maine House of Representatives from District 151 when he defeated Republican John Carson and unenrolled Gary Beers, replacing Walter Wheeler, who was unable to run again due to term-limits.  He was a history teacher at Thornton Academy. In 2009, Beliveau was appointed the Board of Trustees of the Maine Community College System by Governor John Baldacci. In 2012, Beliveau did not seek re-election.

Devin is currently a high school teacher at Samueli Academy, located in Santa Ana, California.

Personal
Beliveau, a fourth generation Mainer, attended Hall-Dale High School in Farmingdale and Colby College in Waterville. He spent a year after graduating from Colby as an AmeriCorps volunteer with the I Have a Dream Foundation. His then began working in public schools in Massachusetts and California, where he earned a master's in education from Stanford University.

References

External links
Campaign Website

Year of birth missing (living people)
Living people
People from Kittery, Maine
Democratic Party members of the Maine House of Representatives
Colby College alumni
Stanford Graduate School of Education alumni
Educators from Maine